The 1966 season was the 61st season of competitive football in Norway.

1. divisjon

2. divisjon

Group A

Group B

3. divisjon

Group Østland/Søndre

Group Østland/Nordre

Group Sørland/Vestland, A

Group Sørland/Vestland, B

Group Sørland/Vestland, C

Group Møre

Group Trøndelag

District IX

District X

District XI

Play-off Sørland/Vestland
Vigør - Vard 2-2
Vard - Os 1-0
Os - Vigør 1-2

Play-off Møre/Trøndelag
Kvik - Herd 2-1
Herd - Kvik 2-2 (agg. 3-4)
Kvik (Trondheim) promoted

Northern Norway Championship
Mjølner - Stein 5-0
Mo - Mjølner 1-3
Stein - Mo (Cancelled)

4. divisjon

District I

District II, Group A

District II, Group B

District III, Group A (Oplandene)

District III, Group B1 (Sør-Østerdal)

District III, Group B2 (Nord-Østerdal)

District III, Group B3 (Sør-Gudbrandsdal)

District III, Group B4 (Nord-Gudbrandsdal)

District IV, Group A (Vestfold)

District IV, Group B (Grenland)

District IV, Group B (Øvre Telemark)

District V, Group A1 (Aust-Agder)

District V, Group A2 (Vest-Agder)

District V, Group B1 (Rogaland)

District V, Group B2 (Rogaland)

District V, Group B3 (Sunnhordland)

District VI, Group A (Bergen)

District VI, Group B (Midthordland)

District VI, Group C (Sogn og fjordane)

District VII, Group A (Sunnmøre)

District VII, Group B (Romsdal)

District VII, Group C (Nordmøre)

District VIII, Group A (Sør-Trøndelag)

District VIII, Group B (Trondheim)

District VIII, Group C (Fosen)

District VIII, Group D (Nord-Trøndelag/Namdal)

District IX

District X

District XI

Play-off District I/IV
Heddal  - Fram 1-1
Brevik - Sparta 3-2
Sparta - Heddal 1-2
Fram - Brevik 6-0
Sparta - Frem 1-2
Brevik - Heddal 2-2

Play-off District II/III
Røros - Nordre Trysil 2-6
Faaberg - Sel 4-3
Faaberg - Nordre Trysil 5-2
Faaberg - Stabæk 2-3
Kongsberg - Mesna 0-0
Stabæk - Kongsberg 3-1
Mesna - Faaberg 1-0
Mesna - Stabæk 2-2
Kongsberg - Faaberg 2-1

Play-off District V
Odda - Stavanger 2-0
Ålgård - Odda 2-2
Stavanger - Ålgård 3-4

Championship District V
Vindbjart - Rygene 9-1
Vindbjart - Odda (not played)

Play-off District VI
Florvåg - Tornado 5-2
Tornado - Nymark 1-1
Nymark - Florvåg 3-1

Play-off District VII
Spjelkavik - Kristiansund 0-0
Nord-Gossen - Spjelkavik 1-1
Kristiansund - Nord-Gossen 2-0

Play-off District VIII
Namsos - Brekstad 4-3
Orkdal - Brage 1-0
Brekstad - Brage 3-3
Namsos - Orkdal 3-2
Brage - Namsos 1-0
Brekstad - Orkdal 3-3

Norwegian Cup

Final

Northern Norwegian Cup

Final

European Cup

Norwegian representatives
Vålerengen (Champions Cup)
Skeid (Cup Winners Cup)
Frigg (Fairs Cup)

Champions Cup

First round
17 Nentori Tirana (Albania) withdrew and Vålerengen had a walkover.

Second round
October 25: Vålerengen - Linfield (Northern Ireland) 1–4

November 8: Linfield - Vålerengen 1–1 (agg. 5–2)

Cup Winners' Cup

First round
August 30: Skeid - Zaragoza (Spain) 3–2

October 12: Zaragoza - Skeid 3–1 (agg. 5–4)

Fairs Cup

First round
August 24: Frigg - Dunfermline (Scotland) 1–3

September 28: Dunfermline - Frigg 3–1 (agg. 6–2)

National team

 

Note: Norway's goals first 
Explanation:
ECQ = European Championship Qualifier

External links
 RSSSF Norway

 
Seasons in Norwegian football